Nor'easter is a drama and thriller film directed by Andrew Brotzman. It was released in 2012 in the Mill Valley Film Festival, and in 2017 on streaming.

Synopsis 
After disappearing for years, a boy mysteriously returns to his family and only a priest decides to investigate what happened.

Cast 
 David Call as Erik Angstrom
 Richard Bekins as Richard Green
 Liam Aiken as Josh Green
 Haviland Morris as Ellen Green
 Rachel Brosnahan as Abby Green
 Danny Burstein as Paul Moore
 Geary Smith as David Kracauer
 Emory Cohen as Danny Strout
 Barb Bowers as doctor
 Clarissa Brown as Beth

Reception 
Dennis Harvey, writing for Variety said that the  "Nor’easter reps a promising if not entirely satisfying feature debut for writer-helmer Andrew Brotzman. Consistently intriguing effort at times feels uncertain how to balance its emphasis on two central protags."

IndieWire gave it a score of B+. Gabe Toro wrote: "As secrets unravel in the film’s
tense third act, you’d think that the story would go off the rails, but Brotzman keeps the direction tight, creating an intimate story with low practical stakes, but heavy spiritual ones. The film doesn’t resonate as sharply as it should (...) But “Nor’easter” never disrespects him or the other characters in creating a
borderline claustrophobic drama with an ending that will likely haunt most moviegoers long after the credits have rolled."

References

External links 

American thriller drama films
2012 films
2012 thriller drama films
2010s English-language films
2010s American films